Stella Garcia (born July 6, 1942) is an American actress who appeared in the films The Private Lives of Adam and Eve, Change of Habit, The Last Movie, and Joe Kidd.

Career

Early roles
Garcia's first film role was in the early 1960s in The Private Lives of Adam and Eve. In 1963, she had a small part in the Elvis Presley film Fun in Acapulco as the Señorita at Torito's.

Success
At the beginning of the 1970s, she was cast in the film The Last Movie (1971) which was the second directorial effort for Dennis Hopper, who had just finished Easy Rider. In the film she played Hopper's girlfriend. The review from Variety included positive recognition for her part in the movie. This impressed Universal Studios, who cast her as the female lead in the western Joe Kidd, starring Clint Eastwood. Her role in the film was that of Helen Sanchez, a Mexican-American activist who was the lover of Luis Chama, played by John Saxon. Her performance received positive reviews, especially from the Los Angeles Times. In spite of the attention she attracted for The Last Movie and Joe Kidd, her career in films subsequently began to decline. She appeared in one other film during the 1970s, the Albert Band-directed She Came to the Valley, as a Christmas party guest.

Later years
In 1996, she played the part of Maria in the film Eye for an Eye which starred Sally Field and Kiefer Sutherland. Her final film role was in 1997, as a South African businesswoman in the film Playing God.

She attended the April 25, 2014 screening of Dennis Hopper's The Last Movie at Paramount Studios, Hollywood, California. Garcia arrived at the event with Jodi Wille, director of the documentary The Source Family. Three of Dennis Hopper’s four children were also at the event.

Filmography

References

External links

20th-century American actresses
Living people
Hispanic and Latino American actresses
1942 births
21st-century American women